Althaea cannabina, commonly called palm-leaf marshmallow or hemp-leaved hollyhock, is a perennial herb belonging to the genus Althaea of the family Malvaceae. The leaves resemble those of hemp (Cannabis sativa), hence the specific epithet cannabina ("hemp-like").

Description
Althaea cannabina reaches on average  of height. The stem is erect,  cylindrical, pubescent and very branched. The upper leaves are simply lobed and toothed. The flowering period extends from July through September.

Gallery

Distribution
Althaea cannabina grows wild in central and southern Europe and in the Mediterranean Basin, from Portugal, north Africa and east to Turkey - except Balearic Islands, Corsica, Crete and Chipre - up to central Asia.

Habitat
They prefer coastal thickets, forest edges, meadows, weedy places, roads, wasteland, pastures and parks, especially with rocky and calcareous soils.

References

External links

 
 Biolib

Malveae
Plants described in 1753
Taxa named by Carl Linnaeus